Chicha is a 1991 Soviet comedy film directed by Vitaly Melnikov.

Plot 
The film tells about a kind artist who throughout his life sang in a strange voice.

Cast 
 Mikhail Dorofeev
 Nina Usatova
 Boryslav Brondukov
 Sergey Sazontev
 Mikhail Kabatov
 Valeriya Mulakevich
 Ivan Smirnov
 Viktor Bychkov
 Viktor Bortsov
 Aleksandr Kovalyov

References

External links 
 

1991 films
1990s Russian-language films
Soviet comedy films
1991 comedy films